The Women's Kakusei was a Go competition.

Outline
The Women's Kakusei used a knockout format.

Past winners

Go competitions in Japan